The following lists events that happened during 1881 in the Kingdom of Belgium.

Incumbents
Monarch: Leopold II
Prime Minister:Walthère Frère-Orban

Events
 10 May – Princess Stéphanie of Belgium marries Rudolf, Crown Prince of Austria, in the Augustinian Church, Vienna.
 8 September – Isidore-Joseph du Rousseaux performs the canonical coronation of Our Lady of Tongre in Chièvres, mandated in a papal brief of Pope Leo XIII.

Publications
Periodicals
 L'Art Moderne begins publication.

Books
 Exposition de l'art ancien au Pays de Liège: Catalogue officiel (Liège, L. Grandmont-Donders)
 A Handbook for Travellers in Holland and Belgium (London, John Murray).
 Alfred Giron, Le droit administratif de la Belgique (Brussels, Bruylant-Christophe)
 François Nizet, Voyage de Bruxelles à Aix-la-Chapelle: Excursions de Sa Majesté la Reine des Belges (Brussels)

Art and architecture

Buildings
 Adolphe Vanderheggen, Halles Saint-Géry (Brussels)

Births
 15 January – Maurice Corneil de Thoran, musician (died 1953)
 6 February – Huib Hoste, architect (died 1957)
 28 February – Geo Verbanck, sculptor (died 1961)
 17 March – Raoul Daufresne de la Chevalerie, sportsman and soldier (died 1967)
 12 April – François Poels, trade unionist (died 1926)
 28 July – Léon Spilliaert, artist (died 1946)

Deaths
 6 June – Henri Vieuxtemps (born 1820), composer
 27 July – François-Joseph Scohy (born 1831), archaeologist
 7 November – Auguste Vander Meersch (born 1810), biographer
 12 November – Jan Michiel Ruyten (born 1813), artist
 28 December – André-Eugène Pirson (born 1817), banker and politician

References

 
1880s in Belgium
Belgium
Years of the 19th century in Belgium
Belgium